The Complete Blue Note and Roost Recordings is a four-disc box set, released on October 4, 1994, containing the bulk of jazz pianist Bud Powell's recordings as leader for Blue Note Records, plus two early sessions for Roost Records.

Track listing
Except where otherwise noted, all songs composed by Bud Powell.

Disc one
"I'll Remember April" (Gene de Paul, Patricia Johnston, Don Raye) – 2:54
"(Back Home Again in) Indiana" (James Hanley, Ballard MacDonald) – 2:45
"Somebody Loves Me" (George Gershwin, Ballard MacDonald, B. G. De Sylva) – 2:56
"I Should Care" (Axel Stordahl, Paul Weston, Sammy Cahn) – 3:02
"Bud's Bubble" – 2:36
"Off Minor" (Thelonious Monk) – 2:24
"Nice Work If You Can Get It" (George Gershwin, Ira Gershwin) – 2:20
"Everything Happens To Me" (Matt Dennis, Tom Adair) – 2:41
"Bouncing with Bud" (alternate take #1) (Gil Fuller, Powell) – 3:03
"Bouncing with Bud" (alternate take #2) (Fuller, Powell) – 3:12
"Bouncing with Bud" (Fuller, Powell) – 3:01
"Wail" (alternate take) – 2:38
"Wail" – 3:02
"Dance of the Infidels" (alternate take) – 2:52
"Dance of the Infidels" – 2:50
"52nd Street Theme" (Monk) – 2:45
"You Go to My Head" (J. Fred Coots, Haven Gillespie) – 3:11
"Ornithology" (Benny Harris, Charlie Parker) – 2:20
"Ornithology" (alternate take) (Harris, Parker) – 3:07
"Un Poco Loco" (alternate take #1) – 3:46
"Un Poco Loco" (alternate take #2) – 4:28
"Un Poco Loco" – 4:42
"Over the Rainbow" (Harold Arlen, E.Y. "Yip" Harburg) – 2:55

Disc two
"A Night in Tunisia" (Dizzy Gillespie, Frank Paparelli) – 4:16
"A Night in Tunisia" (alternate take) (Gillespie, Paparelli) – 3:52
"It Could Happen to You" (alternate take) (Jimmy Van Heusen, Johnny Burke) – 2:22
"It Could Happen to You" (Van Heusen, Burke) – 3:16
"Parisian Thoroughfare" – 3:25
"Autumn in New York" (Vernon Duke) – 2:51
"Reets and I" (Benny Harris) – 3:18
"Reets and I" (alternate take) (Harris) – 2:30
"Sure Thing" (Jerome Kern, Ira Gershwin) – 2:39
"Collard Greens and Black-Eyed Peas" (alternate take) (Oscar Pettiford) – 2:11
"Collard Greens and Black-Eyed Peas" (Pettiford) – 3:01
"Polka Dots and Moonbeams" (Van Heusen, Burke) – 4:00
"I Want to Be Happy" (Vincent Youmans, Irving Caesar) – 2:50
"Audrey" – 2:54
"Glass Enclosure" – 2:21
"Embraceable You" (George Gershwin, Ira Gershwin) – 2:51 
"Burt Covers Bud" – 3:07
"My Heart Stood Still" (Richard Rodgers, Lorenz Hart) – 3:20
"You'd Be So Nice to Come Home To" (Cole Porter) – 2:41
"Bags' Groove" (Milt Jackson) – 2:14
"My Devotion" (Roc Hillman, Johnny Napton) – 3:05
"Stella by Starlight" (Victor Young) – 2:10
"Woody 'n' You" (Dizzy Gillespie) – 3:00

Disc three
"Blue Pearl" – 3:46
"Blue Pearl" (alternate take) – 4:03
"Keepin' In The Groove" – 2:53
"Some Soul" – 6:56
"Frantic Fancies" – 4:50
"Bud On Bach" – 2:30
"Idaho" (Jesse Stone) – 5:14
"Don't Blame Me" (Jimmy McHugh, Dorothy Fields) – 7:31
"Moose the Mooche" (Parker) – 5:45
"John's Abbey" – 5:36
"Sub City" (alternate take) – 2:36
"Sub City" – 4:32
"John's Abbey" (alternate take) – 2:25
"Buster Rides Again" – 5:30

Disc four
"Dry Soul" – 6:41
"Marmalade" – 4:28
"Monopoly" – 4:47
"Time Waits" – 5:06
"The Scene Changes" – 3:59
"Down With It" – 3:58
"Comin' Up" (alternate take) – 5:26
"Comin' Up" – 7:54
"Duid Deed" – 5:06
"Cleopatra's Dream" – 4:22
"Gettin' There" – 5:01
"Crossin' The Channel" – 3:28
"Danceland" – 3:41
"Borderick" – 1:58
"Like Someone in Love" (Van Heusen, Burke) – 6:18

Personnel
Bud Powell plays piano on all tracks.

January 10, 1947, New York. Disc 1, tracks 1-8. Roost session – see Bud Powell Trio.
Curly Russell – bass
Max Roach – drums

August 9, 1949, WOR Studios, New York. Disc 1, tracks 9-19. See The Amazing Bud Powell, Vol. 1.
Fats Navarro – trumpet (tracks 9-16)
Sonny Rollins – tenor sax (tracks 9-16)
Tommy Potter – bass
Roy Haynes – drums

May 1, 1951, WOR Studios, New York. Disc 1, tracks 20-23 and disc 2, tracks 1-5. See The Amazing Bud Powell, Vol. 1 and  The Amazing Bud Powell, Vol. 2.
Curly Russell – bass (except disc 1, track 23 and disc 2, tracks 3-4 – Powell solos)
Max Roach – drums (except disc 1, track 23 and disc 2, tracks 3-4 – Powell solos)

August 14, 1953, WOR Studios, New York. Disc 2, tracks 6-15. See The Amazing Bud Powell, Vol. 2.
George Duvivier – bass
Art Taylor – drums

September 1953, New York. Disc 2, tracks 16-23. Roost session – see Bud Powell Trio.
George Duvivier – bass
Art Taylor – drums

August 3, 1957, Rudy Van Gelder Studio, Hackensack, New Jersey. Disc 3, tracks 1-9. See Bud! The Amazing Bud Powell (Vol. 3).
Curtis Fuller – trombone (tracks 7-9)
Paul Chambers – bass (except track 6 – Powell solo)
Art Taylor – drums (except track 6 – Powell solo)

May 24, 1958, Rudy Van Gelder Studio, Hackensack, New Jersey. Disc 3, tracks 10-14 and disc 4, tracks 1-4. See Time Waits: The Amazing Bud Powell (Vol. 4).
Sam Jones – bass
Philly Joe Jones – drums

December 28, 1958, Rudy Van Gelder Studio, Hackensack, New Jersey. Disc 4, tracks 5-14. See The Scene Changes: The Amazing Bud Powell (Vol. 5).
Paul Chambers – bass
Art Taylor – drums

May 23, 1963, CBS Studios, Paris. Disc 4, track 15. See Dexter Gordon's Our Man in Paris.
Pierre Michelot – bass
Kenny Clarke – drums

References

The Complete Blue Note and Roost Recordings at [ allmusic.com]

Albums produced by Alfred Lion
Bud Powell compilation albums
1994 compilation albums
Blue Note Records compilation albums